NGC 4746 is an edge-on spiral galaxy located 107 million light-years away in the constellation Virgo. It was discovered by John Herschel during a sky-survey on March 29, 1830.

References

External links 
 

Spiral galaxies
Virgo (constellation)
4746
Astronomical objects discovered in 1830
043601